Thomas J. Duch (born September 3, 1956) is an American public servant and Democratic Party politician from Bergen County, New Jersey.

Biography
Duch was born in 1956 in Passaic to Thomas and Helen O. Duch. His brother John Gregory Duch (1960–2017) would follow Thomas in serving in Garfield city government. He graduated from Garfield High School, received a B.A. in government from Lehigh University in 1978, and a J.D. from Seton Hall University School of Law in 1981; he was admitted to the bar that same year. He practices law at a firm in Elmwood Park, New Jersey. In 1980, at the age of 23, Duch was elected mayor of Garfield; he was reelected in 1984.

In 1987, Duch and running mate Passaic Council President Louis J. Gill defeated Republican candidates Frank B. Calandriello and Andrew E. Bertone for two seats in the New Jersey General Assembly from the 36th district after the two incumbent Republicans chose not to run for reelection. The two were reelected in 1989. In 1990, Duch cast one of the final votes in favor of Governor James Florio's unpopular income tax increases. In the 1991 elections, following a redistricting which moved Garfield into the 38th district, Duch and his new running mate Frank Biasco were defeated by incumbent Republican Assembly members Patrick J. Roma and Rose Marie Heck.

Duch would later move to Wyckoff. In 2003, he was hired as the city manager for Garfield. In 2017, he was the Democratic nominee for the New Jersey Senate from the 40th district. However, he was defeated in the general election by appointed Republican incumbent Kristin Corrado. A park along the Dundee Dam in Garfield, land which began to be acquired by the city during Duch's mayoralty, was renamed for Duch in 2016.

Duch took the position as Bergen County Administrator in June 2021, succeeding Julien X. Neals who had been appointed as a federal judge.

References

1956 births
Living people
Garfield High School (New Jersey) alumni
New Jersey lawyers
Lehigh University alumni
Seton Hall University School of Law alumni
Mayors of places in New Jersey
Democratic Party members of the New Jersey General Assembly
People from Garfield, New Jersey
People from Wyckoff, New Jersey
Politicians from Bergen County, New Jersey
Politicians from Passaic, New Jersey